Super Idol may refer to:

Super Idol (Greek TV series),  Greek version of the British television hit show Pop Idol
Super Idol (Taiwanese TV series),  Taiwanese music competition to find new singing talent
"Super Idol 2004", 2004 single/EP by Stavros Konstantinou